Neutral Records is an independent record label. Glenn Branca ran the label during the No Wave and post-punk scene in the Lower East Side, New York City, in the late 1970s and early 1980s. Among their releases were early records by Swans and the first EP by Sonic Youth  as well as Confusion Is Sex.

Sources
 Article by Alan Licht about Glenn Branca mentioning Neutral Records.

American independent record labels
Alternative rock record labels